"From the Pinnacle to the Pit" is a song by the Swedish rock band Ghost. The track was released as the second single from the group's third studio album Meliora.

Background and release
A Nameless Ghoul called "From the Pinnacle to the Pit" a "truly stomping riff-based song, Led Zeppelin-style" and "something that would sound great coming out of a car stereo in an American high school parking lot."
The song was released on July 17, 2015.

Music video
The song's music video was directed by Zev Deans, and was filmed in a style reminiscent of 1920s silent movies, and clips from the 1930 Cecille B DeMille movie Madame Satan were also used, including a scene where actress Kay Johnson and actor Reginald Denny danced.  In the video, a student is sent to the headmaster’s office only to be shown how man can harness the power of a god. The student is turned into an all-powerful man who despises what he’s become. This evolves into the creation of Ghost vocalist Papa Emeritus III.

Personnel
Music
 Papa Emeritus III − vocals
 Nameless Ghouls – all instrumentalists: lead guitarist , bassist , keyboardist , drummer , rhythm guitarist 

Artwork
 David M. Brinley – single artwork

References

External links

2015 singles
2015 songs
Ghost (Swedish band) songs
Songs written by Tobias Forge
Songs written by Klas Åhlund